is a railway station in the city of Ichinomiya, Aichi Prefecture, Japan, operated by Meitetsu.

Lines

Station layout
The station has two opposed side platforms, connected by a level crossing, with track two on a passing loop. The station has automated ticket machines, Manaca automated turnstiles and is unattended.

Platforms

Adjacent stations

|-
!colspan=5|Nagoya Railroad

Station history
Kariyasuka Station was opened on January 24, 1900 as a station on the privately held Bisai Railroad, which was purchased by Meitetsu on August 1, 1925 becoming the Meitetsu Bisai Line.

Passenger statistics
In fiscal 2013, the station was used by an average of 945 passengers daily.

Surrounding area
Yamato Nishi Elementary School
site of Kariyasuka Castle

See also
 List of Railway Stations in Japan

References

External links

 Official web page 

Railway stations in Japan opened in 1900
Railway stations in Aichi Prefecture
Stations of Nagoya Railroad
Ichinomiya, Aichi